Aliabad-e Tarkan (also Romanized as ‘Alīābād-e Tarḵan; also known as ‘Alīābād) is a village in Shamkan Rural District, Sheshtomad District, Sabzevar County, Razavi Khorasan Province, Iran. At the 2006 census, its population was 139, in 38 families.

See also 

 List of cities, towns and villages in Razavi Khorasan Province

References 

Populated places in Sabzevar County